North Belle Vernon is a borough in Westmoreland County, Pennsylvania, United States. The population was 1,971 at the time of the 2010 census.

Geography
North Belle Vernon is located at  (40.131360, -79.863447).

Demographics

As of the census of 2000, there were 2,107 people, 928 households, and 596 families living in the borough.

The population density was 4,826.3 people per square mile (1,848.9/km2). There were 992 housing units at an average density of 2,272.3 per square mile (870.5/km2).

The racial makeup of the borough was 97.44% White, 1.28% African American, 0.05% Native American, 0.57% Asian, 0.09% Pacific Islander, 0.05% from other races, and 0.52% from two or more races. Hispanic or Latino of any race were 0.90% of the population.

There were 928 households, out of which 25.6% had children under the age of eighteen living with them; 49.5% were married couples living together, 12.2% had a female householder with no husband present, and 35.7% were non-families. 32.7% of all households were made up of individuals, and 20.7% had someone living alone who was sixty-five years of age or older.

The average household size was 2.27 and the average family size was 2.88.

In the borough the population was spread out, with 20.6% under the age of eighteen, 7.3% from eighteen to twenty-four, 26.9% from twenty-five to forty-four, 21.9% from forty-five to sixty-four, and 23.2% who were sixty-five years of age or older. The median age was forty-two years.

For every one hundred females, there were 83.2 males. For every one hundred females aged eighteen and over, there were 77.9 males.

The median income for a household in the borough was $30,721, and the median income for a family was $39,728. Males had a median income of $36,007 compared with that of $23,103 for females.

The per capita income for the borough was $21,756.

Roughly 6.0% of families and 6.8% of the population were living below the poverty line, including 10.5% of those who were under the age of eighteen and 4.3% of those who were aged sixty-five or over.

References

Boroughs in Westmoreland County, Pennsylvania
Populated places established in 1758
Pittsburgh metropolitan area